Indenols are hydroxylated indene. 3-Indenol is an enol forms of 1-indanone, and 2-indenol is an enol form of 2-indanone. Isomerization of 1-indenol can produce 1-indanone. Indenolol is a derivative of a phenolic indenol.

References 

Indenes
Alcohols